The Challenge: Fresh Meat II is the 19th season of the MTV reality game show, The Challenge. Fresh Meat II is the sequel to the show's 12th season, Fresh Meat. Continuing with the precursor's advent of original contestants, Fresh Meat II also introduced a slew of previously unknown contestants who had never appeared on either The Real World or Road Rules.

Filmed in Whistler, British Columbia, Fresh Meat II featured two-player teams; each team had an alumnus of The Real World, Road Rules, or the original Fresh Meat, partnered with a newcomer of the opposite gender to The Challenge (collectively known as the new "Fresh Meat"). A "Meet the Meat" special premiered on March 31, 2010. The season premiered on April 7, 2010, and concluded on June 9, 2010, with the reunion show. Fresh Meat II marked the second time in which the show was renamed, no longer using Real World/Road Rules as the main title, but simply The Challenge, though host T. J. Lavin used "Real World/Road Rules Challenge" on the first episode in speaking to the contestants.

Contestants

 Age at the time of filming.

Format
Fresh Meat II follows the same format as the original Fresh Meat season. The only difference in format is that the teams do not participate in a follow-up challenge prior to the Exile elimination. Therefore, the teams nominated for Exile do not have a chance to win a pardon and replace themselves with a non-winning team from the previous mission, as was the case in original Fresh Meat.

At the end of the season, four teams will compete in the final challenge. First-place wins $200,000, second-place wins $60,000, third-place wins $40,000 and fourth-place wins nothing.

Teams

Stats
Each of the 13 Fresh Meat II cast members participated in a combine, testing their strength, stamina, and mental ability. The alumni used the stats from each player's obstacle course performance to determine their partner.

The multi-challenge obstacle course included:
 Pull-ups
 40-yard dash
 Vertical leap
 An obstacle course consisting of a series of wall climbs, a Brainteaser puzzle, and a rope climb

Other combine activities were completed (based on the stat sheets shown in the opening episode), but these activities as well as everyone's stats, were not shown in full.

Draft selections

Gameplay

Challenge games
 Dirty Mouth: Players have to transfer oversize balls out of a mud pit while blindfolded. The challenge is played in multiple rounds, alternating between male and female. There are fewer balls than players, and the blindfolded players are guided by their partners on the sidelines as to where a ball is located, as well as if they can steal a ball from an opposing player. If a player fails to get out of the pit with a ball before the end of a round, that player, along with their partner, is eliminated from the remainder of the challenge. The last player remaining who transfers a ball out of the mud pit wins the challenge for their team.
 Winners: Kenny & Laurel
 I'll Be There For You: Teams have to pick up a weighted chest that is chained to a platform submerged 15 feet below water. Once a player swims down to pick up the chest, the chest cannot touch the platform, and their teammate can swim down to relieve their partner if he/she needs to take a breath above the water. If the chest drops down to the platform, or if the heads of both team members go above the water, the team's time is stopped. The two teams that hold the chest above the platform for the longest time without both players going above the water will battle it out in a final round, and the team that wins the final round wins the challenge.
 Winners: Landon & Carley
 Water Logged: Teams have to advance from one end of a platform to another that is suspended high above water. Each player has to swing on a series of logs that is hanging from the base of the platform. Each log is of a different length. A team is disqualified if one or both players falls into the water. The team that advances to the end of the platform in the fastest time wins.
 Winners: Kenny & Laurel
 King Of The Wall: Teams have to swim 30 yards from a floating dock to a slippery climbing wall that is positioned at a 45° angle. The team that climbs to the top of the wall and rings a bell in the fastest time wins.
 Winners: Kenny & Laurel
 Drop Out: Teams have to climb up a swivel rope ladder that leads to a platform that is suspended 30 feet above water. After reaching the platform, players have to run, jump and hang onto a large canvas bag that is hanging from above. Both players from each team must hang onto the bag simultaneously for five seconds, which will stop the team time. If one or both players falls into the water, they must start over, but the team time will continue. A team is disqualified if they do not complete the challenge within a 15-minute time limit. The team with the fastest time wins.
 Winners: Kenny & Laurel
 Turn Style: Two giant logs are perpendicularly placed in the center of a "turnstyle," in the shape of a "X," and teams have to push the logs 180° from start to finish. However, other teams will try to do the same — with the other log in the opposite direction, making it difficult for any team to push the logs. The challenge is played in multiple rounds — tournament-style, with two teams per log on opposite sides. The team that wins the final round wins the challenge.
 Winners: Jillian & Pete
 Airheads: Teams have to slide down a 200-foot ramp that will launch each player into a lake, and each team has to swim to the middle of the lake, where there is a floating log holding up a sign containing a diagram of a puzzle. Each team has to memorize the diagram, then swim back to shore to solve a giant puzzle (resembling a Tetris board) that will duplicate the diagram of the sign in the middle of the lake. Each team can swim to and from the diagram and the shore as many times as they need to solve the puzzle, but the team that solves the puzzle in the fastest time wins.
 Winners: Landon & Carley
 Wrecking Ball: Teams have to build an Inukshuk puzzle within a large circular area. The female team member is hanging by a rope, upside down from a platform, in the center that will interfere with the building of the puzzle. The male team member will have to swing their female partner around and away from the center in order to collect the large puzzle pieces, and keep the female partner from knocking over the pieces. The puzzle pieces have to stand for at least five seconds before the team time is stopped. The team that builds the Inukshuk puzzle in the fastest time wins.
 Winners: Jenn & Noor
 Obstacle: Teams have to race through an "obstacle course" that is spread out over half a mile within a field. The course contains ten various "obstacles," in which teams have to race through, over and around them as fast as possible. The tenth and final obstacle is "Defender," in which opposing players have to prevent players of the same gender from advancing from one end of a mud pit to another, where the finish line is located. The team that advances through the entire course in the fastest time wins and automatically advances to the final challenge, while the two teams (out of five) that finish in the bottom two automatically go to Exile.
 Winners: Kenny & Laurel

Exiles
Note: Each Exile elimination alternated between "Lost & Found" and "Weight For Me" in the first seven episodes (though "Weight For Me" was not played in Episode 4), while "Weight For Me: Blackout" was played in both Episodes 8 and 9.

 Lost & Found: Teams are given a map and must carry two weighted backpacks while running through a course in the woods. Along the way they must complete several puzzles. The first team to reach the finish line wins.
Played by: Darrell & Cara Maria vs. Jillian & Pete, Evelyn & Luke vs. Paula & Jeff, Danny & Sandy vs. Jillian & Pete, Evelyn & Luke vs. Wes & Mandi
 Weight For Me: Teams must race up a mountain and complete various brain teaser puzzles. Along the way, they must carry weight of 100 pounds on their shoulders, distributed whichever way they want.
Played by: Kenny & Laurel vs. Sarah & Vinny, CJ & Sydney vs. Landon & Carley
 Weight For Me: Blackout: The exile is played the same as Weight For Me, but played at nighttime. Instead of 100 pounds, the teams must carry around 150 pounds of weight distributed in whichever way they want.
Played by: Evelyn & Luke vs. Landon & Carley, Jenn & Noor vs. Ryan & Theresa

Final challenge
First, each team must paddle a canoe across a giant lake to a puzzle. Once they finish that, they can head to a helicopter. Reaching the helicopter first is very important because it determines the penalty that teams will have to take before they can continue on to the second part of the challenge. The team that wins the first phase gets a two-minute headstart, the second-place finisher gets a one-minute headstart while the third-place finisher gets a 30-second headstart. The second phase of the challenge starts with a giant Sudoku puzzle, followed by a mountain bike ride except that the two bikes are tied together with a rope so the teams will have to stay together. After a puzzle that involves carrying color-coded logs to match a diagram, the teams must climb a very steep mountain, carrying a heavy bag. Once completed with a numbered puzzle, they're given helmets and an ice axe and have to climb the top of the mountain. The first team to climb up the mountain and reaches the flag, wins Fresh Meat II.
 The Challenge: Fresh Meat II Winners: Landon & Carley (won $200,000)
 Second-place: Kenny & Laurel (won $60,000)
 Third-place: Jillian & Pete (won $40,000)
 Fourth-place: Jenn & Noor

Game summary

Elimination chart

Game progress

 The team won the competition
 The team did not win the final challenge, but was awarded a monetary prize
 The team did not win the final challenge and was not awarded a monetary prize
 The team won the challenge, and was safe from Exile
 The team won the Exile
 The team was selected for Exile, but did not have to compete
 The team did not win the challenge, but was safe from Exile
 The team lost the Exile and was eliminated
 The team was disqualified from the competition

Voting progress

Teams

Episodes

Reunion special
The Challenge: Fresh Meat II Reunion was aired after the season finale and was hosted by Maria Menounos on June 9, 2010. The cast members who attended the reunion were: Kenny, Wes, Mandi, Carley, Landon, Jenn, Pete, Theresa, Ryan, Ev, Laurel, Noor, Danny and Jillian. A preview for The Real World: New Orleans is shown, thus ending another challenge reunion.

After filming

In 2015, Carley Johnson married Brandon Mundt in Iceland. Together they have one child.

On December 5, 2015, Theresa González and T. J. Jones welcomed their daughter, Easton Kaia, followed by their first son, Maddox, in April 2019. The couple's second daughter, Layla Capri, was born on July, 19, 2021.

In 2017, Laurel Stucky appeared on MTV's Fear Factor, where she was paired with Aneesa Ferreira. In 2019, she appeared on the fourth season of Ex on the Beach with former girlfriend Nicole Zanatta from Real World: Skeletons. The two first met on season 29 of The Challenge. In 2020, she revealed she was a victim of sexual assault at the age of 21.

In 2018, Cara Maria Sorbello appeared on Fear Factor alongside Chris Tamburello. In the same year, she also appeared on How Far Is Tattoo Far? with her boyfriend Paulie Calafiore. In 2019, Sorbello also appeared on Game of Clones.

In 2018, Vinny Foti was hospitalized after suffering heart failure. He is married to Krista Foti and they have two daughters.

Noor Jehangir competed on the second season of Holey Moley.

Subsequent Challenges

Challenge in bold indicates that the contestant was a finalist on The Challenge.

Note: Laurel made an appearance on Vendettas for an elimination.

Notes

References

External links
 

Fresh Meat II
Television shows set in British Columbia
2010 American television seasons
Television shows filmed in British Columbia